Votkinsk Reservoir is a reservoir formed by the dam of the Votkinsk Hydroelectric Station on the Kama River in Perm Krai, Russia. The town of Chaikovsky is located on the reservoir.

References

Reservoirs in Perm Krai
Reservoirs built in the Soviet Union
Reservoirs in Russia
RVotkinsk